The Type 210 automatic single 100 mm naval gun is the Chinese modification of the Compact model of the French 100 mm naval gun. There are at least two variants, with both sharing similar characteristics with the French weapon.

Type 210
The Type 210 was developed to make the French gun suitable for Chinese deployment. The French gun was incompatible with Soviet and Chinese electronics; it was easier to make the gun compatible with these electronics, and Western electronics, than to alter the electronic suites already aboard warships. Furthermore, the Chinese added the capability to fire laser- and infrared-guided shells; this required significant changes to the magazine.

The weapon's maximum rate of fire for a single type of unguided round was 90 rounds per minute. The rate of fire was reduced when switching between different types of ammunition.

Type H/PJ87
The Type H/PJ87 100 mm naval gun was a further development of the Type 210, but suffered from jamming. It armed the early Type 052-series destroyers.

See also

Weapons of comparable role, performance and era
 4.5 inch Mark 8 naval gun: contemporary standard naval gun for British ships
 5"/54 caliber Mark 45 gun: contemporary standard naval gun for US ships
 AK-130: contemporary 130 mm twin standard naval gun mounting for Russian ships
 French 100 mm naval gun: contemporary standard naval gun for French ships
 Otobreda 127/54 Compact and Otobreda 127/64: contemporary 127 mm naval gun from Italian manufacturer Oto Melara

References 

Artillery of the People's Republic of China
Naval guns of China
100 mm artillery
Military equipment introduced in the 1980s